Olaolu Akorede Olabode Folarin (born October 1, 1989) also known as HG2 Filmworks is a Nigerian-American music video director, commercial filmmaker, graphic designer, entrepreneur and cinematographer.

Early life and Career
Born on October 1, 1989, in Lagos, Nigeria and hails from Kwara State.
Olabode began his production journey as a graphic designer and later opted into full time music video productions in 2010.
In 2011, he founded HG2 Film Works company focused on music videos, creative visuals, and film making.

He has directed music videos for artists such as D'banj, Kiss Daniel, Dammy Krane, Reminisce, 9ice, and Skales.

His music video works has been nominated for awards at the 2015 Nigeria Entertainment Awards, and the Soundcity MVP Awards Festival.

Music videography

Awards and nominations

References

External links

Living people
1989 births
Nigerian music video directors
Nigerian film directors
Nigerian cinematographers